Angela Magaña (born August 2, 1983) is an American mixed martial artist who formerly competed in the Strawweight division of the Ultimate Fighting Championship (UFC). She is also known for competing on The Ultimate Fighter 20 for Team Melendez.

Early life
When Magaña was five, she lived in the streets of Los Angeles with her mother who was addicted to heroin. She slept in back alleys and ate out of garbage cans. Eventually her grandparents gained custody, but Magaña was already scarred with the issues she'd experienced. Her mother overdosed and died when Magaña turned 17. Magana's father is a Mexican national who was deported to Mexico when she was a child. At the age of 14 she was raped by the father of some children that she babysat for while the children's mother watched. The man was convicted for the crime and served 10 years of a 14-year sentence, while the wife was not charged with any crime.

In 2007 Magaña broke her back by falling down three stories of stairs. She has suffered two auto accidents, one of which put her in a coma for several days.

Mixed martial arts career
Magaña started her MMA career on March 23, 2007 at Gladiator Challenge 60 against Tia Castillo. She won via TKO in the first round.

She suffered her first defeat when she tapped out to an armbar by Jessica Aguilar.

Magaña then submitted her next two opponents both by armbar. A rematch was set between her and Aguilar at WFC 6, she lost via technical submission. 

After a split decision victory over Nicdali Rivera-Calanoc at FCF 19, Magaña defeated Aguilar in their trilogy fight in the first round of the HOOKnSHOOT GFight 2009 Grand Prix via majority decision.

Magaña fought Van do in the semi finals. She won via rear-naked choke, and will face Lisa Hugo in the finals. She lost via unanimous decision. 

After going 8-3 Magaña was set to face future Invicta FC Atomweight Champion Jessica Penne. She lost via submission.

She then went on a three fight win streak including a victory over Barb Honchak.

The Ultimate Fighter
Magaña took part as one of the Strawweights on TUF 20.

In her preliminary round bout, Magaña faced Irish stand out Aisling Daly. She lost via TKO in round three.

Ultimate Fighting Championship 
Magaña made her UFC debut at The Ultimate Fighter 20 Finale taking on former teammate Tecia Torres. She lost via decision.

Magaña returned to the octagon to take on the debuting former Invicta FC Atomweight Champion Michelle Waterson at The Ultimate Fighter 21 Finale. She lost the fight via submission in the third round.

Angela Magaña fought in UFC 218 on December 2, 2017 against The Ultimate Fighter: Team Joanna vs. Team Cláudia runner-up Amanda Cooper. She lost the fight via TKO in the second round.

On December 3, 2017, Magaña publicly announced on Twitter that her contract with the UFC had been terminated after a 0-3 record.

Post-UFC career
Magana faced Kanako Murata at Rizin 12 on August 12, 2018. She lost the fight by Von Flue choke, 3:53 into the second round.

Personal life 
In April 2019, Magana was left in an unresponsive  coma after complications following spinal surgery at  University Hospital in San Juan, Puerto Rico. Two days later she woke up from her coma.

Mixed martial arts record

|-
| Loss
|align=center| 11–10
|Kanako Murata
|Submission (Von Flue choke)
|Rizin 12
|
|align=center|2
|align=center|3:53
|Nagoya, Japan
|
|-
| Loss
|align=center| 11–9
|Amanda Cooper
|TKO (punches)
|UFC 218
|
|align=center|2
|align=center|4:32
|Detroit, Michigan, United States
|
|-
| Loss
|align=center| 11–8
|Michelle Waterson
|Submission (rear-naked choke)
|The Ultimate Fighter: American Top Team vs. Blackzilians Finale 
|
|align=center|3
|align=center|2:38
|Las Vegas, Nevada, United States
|
|-
| Loss
|align=center| 11–7
| Tecia Torres
|Decision (unanimous)
| The Ultimate Fighter: A Champion Will Be Crowned Finale
| December 12, 2014
|align=center| 3
|align=center| 5:00
| |Las Vegas, Nevada, United States
|
|-
| Loss
|align=center| 11–6
| Stephanie Eggink
|Submission (triangle choke)
|XFC 25: Boiling Point
|September 6, 2013
|align=center|2
|align=center|3:10
|Albuquerque, New Mexico, United States
|
|-
| Loss
|align=center| 11–5
| Jessica Eye
|Decision (unanimous)
| NAAFS: Rock N Rumble 6
| August 17, 2012
|align=center| 3
|align=center| 5:00
| Cleveland, Ohio, United States
|
|-
| Win
|align=center| 11–4
| Avery Vilche
|Submission (armbar)
| CITR: The New Generation
| August 13, 2011
|align=center| 1
|align=center| 1:09
| Ignacio, Colorado, United States
|
|-
| Win
|align=center| 10–4
| Elsie Zwicker
|Submission (armbar)
| MFA: New Generation 5
| May 7, 2011
|align=center| 1
|align=center| 1:55
| Miami, Florida, United States
|
|-
| Win
|align=center| 9–4
| Barb Honchak
|Decision (split)
| Ultimate Women Challenge
| September 24, 2010
|align=center| 3
|align=center| 5:00
| St George, Utah, United States
|
|-
| Loss
|align=center| 8–4
| Jessica Penne
| Submission (rear-naked choke)
| Action Fight League: Rock-N-Rumble
| September 25, 2009
|align=center| 2
|align=center| 4:10
| Hollywood, Florida, United States
|
|-
| Win
|align=center| 8–3
| Meghan Wright
|Submission (armbar)
|UCFC: Rumble on the Rivers
|June 27, 2009
|align=center| 1
|align=center| 1:35
|Pittsburgh, United States
|
|-
| Win
|align=center| 7–3
| Stephanie Palmer
|TKO (punches)
|CMF: Ground & Pound
|June 20, 2009
|align=center| 1
|align=center| 1:33
|Farmington, New Mexico, United States
|
|-
| Loss
|align=center| 6–3
| Lisa Higo
|Decision (unanimous)
|HOOKnSHOOT: GFight 2009 Grand Prix
|January 16, 2009
|align=center| 3
|align=center| 3:00
|Evansville, Indiana, United States
|
|-
| Win
|align=center| 6–2
| Van Do
|Submission (rear-naked choke)
|HOOKnSHOOT: GFight 2009 Grand Prix
|January 16, 2009
|align=center| 1
|align=center| 1:48
|Evansville, Indiana, United States
|
|-
| Win
|align=center| 5–2
| Jessica Aguilar
|Decision (majority)
|HOOKnSHOOT: GFight 2009 Grand Prix
|January 16, 2009
|align=center| 3
|align=center| 3:00
|Evansville, Indiana, United States
|
|-
| Win
|align=center| 4–2
| Nicdali Rivera-Calanoc
|Decision (Split)
|Freestyle Cage Fighting 19
|May 31, 2008
|align=center| 3
|align=center| 3:00
|Claremore, Oklahoma, United States
|
|-
| Loss
|align=center| 3–2
| Jessica Aguilar
|TKO (blood in the eye)
|WFC 6: Battle in the Bay
|March 22, 2008
|align=center| 3
|align=center| 1:53
|Tampa, Florida, United States
| 
|-
| Win
|align=center| 3–1
| Lynn Alvarez
| Submission (armbar)
| Tuff-N-Uff: Thompson vs. Troyer
|February 8, 2008
|align=center| 2
|align=center| 1:25
|Tampa, Florida, United States
|
|-
| Win
|align=center| 2–1
| Crystal Harris
| Submission (armbar)
| Tuff-N-Uff 3
|June 22, 2007
|align=center| 1
|align=center| 3:10
|Las Vegas, Nevada, United States
|
|-
| Loss
|align=center| 1–1
| Jessica Aguilar
| Submission (armbar)
| WFC 3: Turf Wars
|April 7, 2007
|align=center| 1
|align=center| 3:09
|Tampa, Florida, United States
|
|-
| Win
|align=center| 1–0
| Tia Castillo
| TKO (punches)
| GC 60: Invasion
|March 23, 2007
|align=center|1
|align=center|1:43
|Farmington, New Mexico, United States
|
|-

Mixed martial arts exhibition record

|-
| Loss
|align=center| 0–1
| Aisling Daly
| TKO (punches)
| The Ultimate Fighter: A Champion Will Be Crowned
|October 29, 2014 (airdate)
|align=center|3
|align=center|2:34
|Las Vegas, Nevada, United States
|

Championships and achievements

Mixed martial arts
 2009 HOOKnSHOOT Women's Grand Prix Runner-up

References

External links
 Official Youtube channel
 
 

1985 births
Mixed martial artists from New Mexico
American female mixed martial artists
Flyweight mixed martial artists
Living people
People from Farmington, New Mexico
American mixed martial artists of Mexican descent
Strawweight mixed martial artists
21st-century American women
Ultimate Fighting Championship female fighters